Turning Point – 1977, the 1977 Libertarian Party National Convention was held at the Sheraton-Palace Hotel in San Francisco between July 12 and 17, 1977. It had more than 50 events and an estimated attendance of 1500 people.

Event
A march across the room was organized by a group of libertarian feminists in support of the Equal Rights Amendment; the March featured a few of the leading women in the movement and two men: Robert Anton Wilson and Steve Trinward.

Staff and committees
Walter Grinder, platform committee chair

Changes
 The Executive Committee was renamed the National Committee
 The maximum number of regions was increased from 8 to 10

Speakers, panelists, and honorees

 Linda Abrams
 David Bergland
 Nathaniel Branden, Objectivist leader
 Karl Bray, tax activist
 Jim Eason, radio talk show host
 John Hospers
 Diane Hunter-Smith
 Ann Jackson
 Paul Krassner, editor of The Realist
 Dr. Timothy Leary, 1960s Guru
 Roger MacBride, 1976 presidential nominee
 John D. Marks, co-author of The CIA and the Cult of Intelligence
 Eugene McCarthy, independent presidential candidate and opponent of MacBride in 1976
 Tonie Nathan, 1972 vice presidential candidate
 David Nolan (libertarian), party founder
 Ron Paul, former U.S. Congressman
 Sharon Pressley
 Earl Ravanel, unofficial shadow Secretary of State
 Murray Rothbard, keynote speaker
 Margo St James, chair of COYOTE
 Robert Anton Wilson, author

LNC
 David Bergland, chair
 Mary Louise Hanson, vice chair
 Sylvia Sanders, secretary
 Paul Allen, treasurer
 Ed Clark, at large
 Carol Cunningham, at large
 Eric Garris, at large
 John Hildberg, at large
 Charles Koch, at large
 Dick Randolph, at large
 Murray Rothbard, at large
 Bill Evers, regional representative
 RA Childs, Jr., region 9
 Michael Fieschko, region 9 (alt?)

Other noted events
 William Westminster distributed a pamphlet entitled "On Account of Tyranny"
 The IRA initially had a table, but was asked to leave after their $10 literature table fee was refunded. Their table had been singled out by a speech by David Nolan.
 Aron Kay, pie-throwing Yippie, was present on a mission to pie Timothy Leary

Bibliography

 "National Convention 1977." LPedia.
 Against the Wall (newsletter), vol. 5, no. 10.
 "Libertarian Party National Convention – San Francisco, July 14–17, 1977." Libertarian Party.
 Two typewritten pages containing the text of two resolutions adopted at the 1977: a condemnation of singer Anita Bryant's anti-gay campaign, and of the Briggs Initiative, a California proposition to bar homosexuals from working in public schools.
 Palmer, Tom G., with Tom Avery. "The 1977 Libertarian Party National Convention." Libertarianism.com (October 1977).
 Times-Post Service. "Libertarian Coalition Made Up of Odds, Ends." Salinas Californian (July 15, 1977), p. 34.
 Staff writer. "Liberatarians [sic] Adopt 'Plank.'" Santa Cruz Sentinel (July 21, 1977), p. 8.

Libertarian Party (United States) National Conventions
Libertarian National Convention
Political conventions in California
Libertarian National Convention
Libertarian National Convention
Political events in the San Francisco Bay Area
Conventions in San Francisco